Günther Rybarczyk (born 4 November 1951 in Neuötting) is a retired German football player. He spent two seasons in the Bundesliga with FC Bayern Munich. As of February 2009, he is a player agent.

Honours 
 Bundesliga: 1971–72, 1972–73

References

External links 
 

1951 births
Living people
German footballers
FC Bayern Munich footballers
1. FSV Mainz 05 players
SC Paderborn 07 players
Bundesliga players
2. Bundesliga players
SC Paderborn 07 managers
Association football defenders
People from Altötting (district)
Sportspeople from Upper Bavaria
German football managers
Footballers from Bavaria